APEM may refer to:

 World Student Press Agency (French: Agence de presse étudiante mondiale), a Canadian student news agency
 Advances in Production Engineering & Management, a scientific journal

See also
 Kue apem, an Indonesian cake